Crippen & Landru Publishers is a small publisher of mystery fiction collections, based in Cincinnati, Ohio, United States. It was founded in 1994 by husband and wife Sandi and Douglas G. Greene in Norfolk, Virginia, United States, and is named after murderers Dr. H. H. Crippen and Henri Landru. The Greenes's son Eric designed the logo. Jeffrey Marks succeeded Douglas G. Greene as publisher on January 1, 2018, while Dr. Greene remains active as Series Editor.
 
Crippen & Landru publishes two distinct series of single-author short story collections. The Regular Series, generally featuring current authors, is published in two editions: cloth bound, signed and numbered; and trade softcover. The Lost Classics Series features uncollected stories by great mystery and detective writers of the past. It is available in dust-jacketed cloth and trade softcover. Some titles are also available as e-books.

Among the authors published by Crippen & Landru are Lawrence Block, Max Allan Collins, Margaret Maron, Peter Lovesey, Bill Pronzini, Michael Gilbert, and Edward D. Hoch.

Books published

References

External links

Book publishing companies based in Virginia
Publishing companies established in 1994
American companies established in 1994
1994 establishments in Virginia